Bermuda participated at the 2018 Summer Youth Olympics in Buenos Aires, Argentina from 6 October to 18 October 2018.

Athletics

Bermuda qualified 1 athlete.

Swimming

Bermuda qualified 2 athletes.

References

Nations at the 2018 Summer Youth Olympics
Bermuda at the Youth Olympics
2018 in Bermudian sport